Clarendon High School may refer to:

 Clarendon High School for Girls, Eastern Cape, South Africa
 Clarendon High School, Clarendon, Arkansas, United States
 Clarendon High School, Clarendon, Texas, United States
 Clarendon House Grammar School for girls, Ramsgate, Kent, UK

See also
 Clarendon School
 The Clarendon Academy
 Clarendon College (disambiguation)
 Clarendon (disambiguation)